To Catch a Thief is a 1936 British comedy film directed by Maclean Rogers and starring John Garrick, Mary Lawson and H. F. Maltby.

Cast
 John Garrick - John
 Mary Lawson - Anne
 H. F. Maltby - Sir Herbert Condine
 John Wood - Bill Lowther
 Vincent Holman - Galloway
 Gordon McLeod - Detective
 Eliot Makeham - Secretary
 Max Adrian - Salesman

References

External links

1936 films
1936 comedy films
Films directed by Maclean Rogers
British comedy films
British black-and-white films
1930s English-language films
1930s British films